The Bogotá Film Festival is an annual international film festival held in Bogotá, Colombia, inaugurated in 1984. It takes place in late October each year, with most films being in Spanish and very few in English.

The event is an important showcase for independent cinema, with the 26th staging of the annual event in 2009 showcasing 120 films from 32 countries.

Best Film (Círculo Precolombino de Oro) winners

References

External links

Bogotá Film Festival at Internet Movie Database

Festivals in Bogotá
Culture in Bogotá
Film festivals in Colombia
Film festivals established in 1984
1984 establishments in Colombia